Carl August Schröder (born 21 November 1855 in Hamburg, died 3 November 1945 in Hamburg) was a Hamburg lawyer and politician, who served as First Mayor of Hamburg in 1916.

A member of the Schröder family, he studied in law in Leipzig, and worked as a lawyer in Hamburg from 1879. In 1886, he was elected to the Hamburg Parliament. He was elected to the Senate of Hamburg in 1899 and served until the elections of 1919, following the political reforms. He served as Second Mayor several times from 1910, and as First Mayor in 1916. He became a member of the liberal German People's Party in 1919. During the Weimar Republic's existence he served as a member of the Hamburg Parliament.

References

External links
 

Members of the Hamburg Parliament
Mayors of Hamburg
Senators of Hamburg (before 1919)
Leipzig University alumni
1855 births
1945 deaths